The girls' doubles tournament of the 2015 Badminton Asia Junior Championships was held from July 1 to 5. The defending champions of the last edition were the Chinese pair Chen Qingchen and Jia Yifan. Indonesian pairs Apriani Rahayu / Jauza Fadhila Sugiarto and Marsheilla Gischa Islami / Rahmadhani Hastiyanti Putri leads the seeding this year. Du Yue and Li Yinhui who were the finalists in the last edition emerge as the champion after beat the defending champion Chen and Jia in the finals with the score 21–14, 18–21, 21–18.

Seeded

 Apriani Rahayu / Jauza Fadhila Sugiarto (third round)
 Marsheilla Gischa Islami / Rahmadhani Hastiyanti Putri (third round)
 Chen Qingchen / Jia Yifan (final)
 Nisak Puji Lestari / Rika Rositawati (quarter final)
 Kim Hye-jeong / Park Keun-hye (semi final)
 Ruethaichanok Laisuan / Kilasu Ostermeyer (quarter final)
 Elaine Chua Yi Ling / Crystal Wong Jia Ying (third round)
 Kuhoo Garg / Sonika Sai (second round)

Draw

Finals

Top half

Section 1

Section 2

Section 3

Section 4

Bottom half

Section 5

Section 6

Section 7

Section 8

References

External links 
Main Draw

2015 Badminton Asia Junior Championships
Junior